A telephone network is a telecommunications network that connects telephones, which allows telephone calls between two or more parties, as well as newer features such as fax and internet. The idea was revolutionized in the 1920s, as more and more people purchased telephones and used them to communicate news, ideas, and personal information. During the 1990s, it was further revolutionized by the advent of computers and other sophisticated communication devices, and with the use of dial-up internet.

There are a number of different types of telephone network:

 A landline network where the telephones must be directly wired into a single telephone exchange.  This is known as the public switched telephone network or PSTN.
 A wireless network where the telephones are mobile and can move around anywhere within the coverage area.
 A private network where a closed group of telephones are connected primarily to each other and use a gateway to reach the outside world.  This is usually used inside companies and call centres and is called a private branch exchange (PBX).
 Integrated Services Digital Network (ISDN)

Public telephone operators (PTOs) own and build networks of the first two types and provide services to the public under license from the national government.  Virtual Network Operators (VNOs) lease capacity wholesale from the PTOs and sell on telephony service to the public directly

See also 
 Telephone service (disambiguation)

References

Telecommunications infrastructure